Sanâa Alaoui, also known as Sanaa Alaoui, is a French Moroccan actress.

Life
Alaoui aws born on April 29, 1987 in Casablanca. She earned her high school degree at Lycée Lyautey in Casablanca.

As a polyglot, she collaborated with directors from various nationalities, such as Gustavo Loza, Adil El Arbi and Abdelkader Lagtaâ. She plays in five languages: Arabic, French, Spanish, English and German. 

In 2012, she led the jury of the Festival AMAL in Spain.

Private life
Alaoui currently resides in Casablanca, after several years spent in Paris.

Filmography

Film 
 2018: Operation Red Sea (Opération Mer Rouge) by Dante Lam: Ina
 2015: Black by Adil El Arbi and Bilall Fallah: Mina
 2014: Image by Adil El Arbi and Bilall Fallah: Mina
 2013: Vuelos prohibidos by Rigoberto Lopez: Monica
 2011: Poupiya by Samia Charkioui (short film)
 2008: Terminus des anges by Hicham Lasri, Narjiss Nejjar and Mohamed Mouftakir: Samia
 2008: Ça se soigne ? by Laurent Chouchan: Samia
 2008: Un novio para Yasmina (Un fiancé pour Yasmina) by Irene Cardona: Yasmina
 2007: Yasmine et les hommes by Abdelkader Lagtaâ: Yasmine
 2007: Oud Al ward ou la beauté éparpillée by Lahcen Zinoun: Oud l'Ward
 2005: Ici et là by Mohamed Ismaïl: Samira
 2004: Le Pain nu (Al khoubz al hafi) by Rachid Benhadj: Mohamed Choukri's mother
 2004: Al otro lado (De l'autre côté) by Gustavo Loza: the mother
 2004: Le Cadeau by Jamal Souissi (short film)
 2002: Face à face by Abdelkader Lagtaâ: Amal
 1996: Le Cri de la soie by Yvon Marciano: Aicha

 Television 
 2020: Le secret enterréof Yassine Fennane : Ferdaous
 2019: Coeur Karimof Abdelhay Laaraki : Professeur Nezha
 2016: Le juge est une femme, ep. Mauvais genre: Dalila Bensalem
 2011: Fischer fischt Frau, TV film by Lars Jessen: Mona
 2011: Section de recherches: Leïla Rezoug
 2010: Les Virtuoses, TV series, 1 episode: Nora Belassen
 2008: Bajo el mismo cielo, TV film by Sílvia Munt
 2008: Julie Lescaut, television series, 2 episodes: Maud
 2008: Famille d'accueil, a series by Stéphane Kaminka, 3 ep.: Lila
 2007: Duval et Moretti, a series by Stéphane Kaminka, 3 ep.: Lila
 2006: Les Rimaquoi (France 5): various roles
 2002: Préjudices: Nadia Chianti
 2002: Les grands frères, leading ep.: Malika
 2001: Le juge est une femme, ep. L'Ami d'enfance: Malika

Awards
 February 2018: tribute at the International Youth Film Festival in Meknès
 November 2017: tribute at the Festival méditerranéen cinéma et immigration in Oujda
 September 2017 : tribute at the Khouribga African Film Festival<ref>{{cite news|lang=fr|url=https://www.mazagan24.com/2017/09/15/le-maroc-rend-hommage-a-son-lactrice-universelle-sanaa-alaoui/ | title= Le Maroc rend hommage à son " l'actrice universelle ", Sanâa Alaoui|website=mazagan24.com|date=September 15, 2017}}</ref>
 2009: New Talent Award at the MedFilm Festival in Rome
 2007: first prize for Feminine Role at Moroccan National Film Festival for her role in Lahcen Zinoun's Oud Al’ward ou La Beauté éparpillée.

References

External links

 
 
 Sanâa Alaoui, Télérama 

20th-century Moroccan actresses
21st-century Moroccan actresses
Moroccan film actresses
Moroccan television actresses
20th-century French actresses
21st-century French actresses
French film actresses
French television actresses
French people of Moroccan descent
Alumni of Lycée Lyautey (Casablanca)
People from Casablanca
1987 births
Living people